Bashanosaurus (meaning "Bashan lizard", after an ancient name for Chongqing) is a genus of stegosaur dinosaur recovered from the Bajocian (Middle Jurassic)-aged Shaximiao Formation of Yunyang, Chongqing, China. The type species is Bashanosaurus primitivus. It is one of the basalmost stegosaurs and is also the oldest known stegosaur, supplanting the previous oldest known stegosaur, Adratiklit, which is roughly one million years younger.

Discovery and naming 
Bashanosaurus is known from two partial skeletons, along with a vertebra that comes from a third individual; these remains were preserved on the Dinosaur Fossil Wall, preserved within the Zigong Dinosaur Museum, along the with another specimen, a partial cranium, a dorsal vertebra, and a piece of dermal armour (CLGPR V00006), which belongs to an unnamed indeterminate stegosaur. The material was recovered from a quarry in Chongqing discovered in 2016, hailing from the Shaximiao Formation. The specimens were given the name Bashanosaurus primitivus in a 2022 paper, in reference to the old name of Chongqing and its basal position.

The holotype, CLGPR V00006-1, includes limb bones, back and tail vertebrae, plates and a spike. The second specimen CLGPR V00006-2, consists of five vertebrae, a right lower leg and a plate. The third specimen is CLGPR V00006-3, a back vertebra. A fourth specimen, CLGPR V00006-4, a partial skeleton with skull, was not referred as it does not share unique traits with the holotype.

Description

Classification 
Several of its features are reminiscent of the basal thyreophoran Scelidosaurus, although it also possesses plesiomorphic thyreophoran traits as well as traits more derived stegosaurs. In light of this unique mosaic of features, a phylogenetic analysis placed it as the most basal stegosaur, in a clade with Chungkingosaurus, consistent with its early age.

References 

Middle Jurassic dinosaurs of Asia
Stegosaurs
Fossil taxa described in 2022
Paleontology in China
Ornithischian genera